is a public urban park, situated at 4 chōme Fukushima in Fukushima-ku, Osaka, Japan.

The park was constructed at the site of the former spinning factory of the Dai-Nihon Spinning Company (current company is Unitika, Ltd.), and is the largest park in Fukushima ward. In the park, spinning factory's old brick wall constructed around 1894 remains, which stopped the fire from air raids during World War II.

There is a legend that here is a cradle place of Wisteria floribunda (Japanese:Noda-Fuji), some Wisteria floribunda is cultivated even today in the park. Fuji-An garden (Japanese Fuji-An no Niwa) where Toyotomi Hideyoshi and Ashikaga Yoshiakira visited, is also restored in the park.

In 2001, the public pool and training centre were renovated and are currently operated by Konami Sports Co.Ltd.

Facilities 

Public pool and training centre : admission required
Play ground (mainly for amateur baseball) : admission required
Fuji-An garden
Parking lot : a fee is charged

Activities in the park 
 The Autumn Fukushima Ward residents' festival

Access 

See also 
Osaka
Nakanoshima
Utsubo Park

References

External links 

Official page of Shimo-fukushima park  (Japanese language)

Photographs 

Fukushima-ku, Osaka
Parks and gardens in Osaka